Andre Anis (born 25 May 1977) is a retired football (soccer) defender from Estonia. He played for several clubs in his native country, including JK Viljandi Tulevik.

International career
Anis earned his first official cap for the Estonia national football team on 19 May, 1995, when Estonia played Latvia at the 1995 Baltic Cup. He obtained a total number of three caps.

References
 
 Jalgpall.ee

External links

1977 births
Living people
Estonian footballers
Estonia international footballers
Association football defenders
Viljandi JK Tulevik players